Tavakkolabad-e Hanarmand (also Romanized as Tavakkolābād-e Hanarmand) is a village in Golzar Rural District, in the Central District of Bardsir County, Kerman Province, Iran. At the 2006 census, its population was 26, in 5 families.

References 

Populated places in Bardsir County